= Pappy Orion Rwizibuka =

Congolese activist (born 1985)

Orion Rwizibuka Boyinkere Pappy, commonly known as Pappy Orion (born 1985), is a Congolese creative director, and activist based in Germany. He is known for his work in humanitarian storytelling and documentary filmmaking. He is the founder of Focus Congo e.V., a non-profit organization working on community development in the Democratic Republic of the Congo, founded in 2015. In 2025, Rwizibuka was included in a list of the 50 Most Influential Africans Under 50. He is also the author of the autobiographical book Flee, My Son: How I Escaped the War in Congo and Found God.

== Background ==
Rwizibuka was born in 1985 in the DR Congo. During his childhood, the country was affected by armed conflict, which led to displacement at a young age. During this time, he lived in several countries across Africa before eventually settling in South Africa. Since 1996, after years of separation, Pappy reunited with his family in 2009. These early experiences later influenced his work in storytelling, filmmaking, and humanitarian advocacy.

== Humanitarian ==
In September 2015, Rwizibuka founded Focus Congo e.V., a Germany-based non-profit organization, and has served as its chairman of the board since its establishment. The organization focuses on education, humanitarian assistance, youth empowerment, and peacebuilding initiatives in the Democratic Republic of the Congo. Focus Congo e.V. partnered with charitable platforms and humanitarian networks in support of community-based development projects.

== Bibliography ==
- Flieh, mein Sohn: Wie ich dem Krieg im Kongo entkam und Gott mich fand (2022). ISBN 978-3775160957
